The 2022 Atlantic Hockey Tournament was the 18th edition of the Atlantic Hockey Tournament. It was played between March 4 and March 19, 2022.

Format
The tournament featured four rounds of play. The top six-seeded teams received byes into the quarterfinal round. In the first round, the seventh-seed hosted the tenth-seed and the eighth-seed hosted the ninth-seed in best-of-three series. The teams that advanced out of the first round are reseeded with the lowest remaining seep playing the first-seed and higher-seed playing the second seed. The other quarterfinal matches have the third seed playing the sixth-seed and the fourth-seed playing the fifth-seed. The higher-seeded teams serve as hosts in the quarterfinal round. All quarterfinal matches are best-of-three series. The four teams that advance out of the quarterfinals will be reseeded with the highest remaining seed playing the lowest remaining seed while the other two teams play one another. Beginning with the semifinal round, all matches become single-elimination. Also beginning with the semifinal round, all games will be played at the Adirondack Bank Center in Utica, New York. The winners of two the semifinal games will play one another to determine the Atlantic Hockey Tournament Champion and receive the conference's automatic bid to the 2022 NCAA Division I Men's Ice Hockey Tournament.

Conference standings

Bracket
Teams are reseeded for the semifinals

Note: * denotes overtime period(s)

Results

First round

(7) Mercyhurst vs. (10) Holy Cross

(8) Niagara vs. (9) Bentley

Quarterfinals

(1) American International vs. (9) Bentley

(2) Canisius vs. (7) Mercyhurst

(3) Army vs. (6) Air Force

(4) RIT vs. (5) Sacred Heart

Semifinal

(1) American International vs. (7) Mercyhurst

(4) RIT vs. (6) Air Force

Championship

(1) American International vs. (6) Air Force

Tournament awards

All-Tournament Team
G: Alec Calvaruso (American International)
D: Brandon Koch (Air Force)
D: Zak Galambos (American International)
F: Blake Bennett* (American International)
F: Chris Dodero (American International)
F: Will Gavin (Air Force)

* Most Valuable Player(s)

References

Atlantic Hockey Tournament
Atlantic Hockey Tournament
Atlantic Hockey Tournament